The women's 200 metre breaststroke event, included in the swimming competition at the 1952 Summer Olympics, took place on 26–29 July, at the Helsinki Swimming Stadium. In this event, swimmers covered four lengths of the 50-metre (160 ft) Olympic-sized pool employing the breaststroke. It was the sixth appearance of the event, which first appeared at the 1924 Summer Olympics in Paris. A total of 33 competitors from 19 nations participated in the event.

Records 
Prior to this competition, the existing world and Olympic records were:

The following records were established during the competition:

Hungarian Éva Székely used the butterfly stroke in this event, which was permissible at the time. At the 1956 Summer Olympics, the 200m breaststroke event only allowed the orthodox breaststroke to be used, and a new 100m butterfly event was created.

Results

Heats

Semifinals

Final

Sources

References

Women's breaststroke 200 metre
1952 in women's swimming
Women's events at the 1952 Summer Olympics